The Everett Massacre (also known as Bloody Sunday) was an armed confrontation between local authorities and members of the Industrial Workers of the World (IWW) union, commonly called "Wobblies". It took place in Everett, Washington on Sunday, November 5, 1916. The event marked a time of rising tensions in Pacific Northwest labor history.

Background

In 1916, Everett, Washington was facing a serious depression. There was ongoing confrontation between business, commercial interests, labor, and labor organizers. There had been a number of labor-organized rallies and speeches in the street. These were opposed by local law enforcement, which was firmly on the side of business. IWW organizers had gone into Everett to support a five-month-long strike by shingle workers. Once there, vigilantes organized by business had beaten them up with axe handles and run them out of town. The Seattle IWW decided to go to Everett in numbers to hold a rally to show their support for the striking shingle workers.

Confrontation at the dock
On November 5, 1916, about 300 IWW members met at the IWW Hall in Seattle and then marched down to the docks where they boarded the steamers Verona and Calista which then headed north to Everett. Verona arrived at Everett before Callista and as they approached the dock in the early afternoon, the Wobblies sang their fight song "Hold the Fort". Local business interests, knowing the Wobblies were coming, placed armed goon squads on the dock and on at least one tugboat in the harbor, Edison, owned by the American Tug Boat Company. As with previous labor demonstrations, the local businessmen had also secured the aid of law enforcement, including the Snohomish County sheriff Donald McRae, who was known for targeting Wobblies for arbitrary arrests and beatings.

Shootout
More than 200 vigilantes or "citizen deputies", under the ostensible authority of Snohomish County Sheriff McRae, met in order to repel the "anarchists." As the Verona drew into the dock, and someone on board threw a line over a bollard, McRae stepped forward and called out "Boys, who's your leader?" The IWW men laughed and jeered, replying "We're all leaders," and they started to swing out the gang plank. McRae drew his pistol, told them he was the sheriff, he was enforcing the law, and they couldn't land here. There was a silence, then a Wobbly came up to the front and yelled out "the hell we can't."

Just then a single shot rang out, followed by about ten minutes of intense gunfire. Most of it came from the vigilantes on the dock, but some fire came from the Verona, although the majority of the passengers were unarmed. Whether the first shot came from boat or dock was never determined. Passengers aboard the Verona rushed to the opposite side of the ship, nearly capsizing the vessel. The ship's rail broke and a number of passengers were ejected into the water, some drowned as a result but how many is not known, or whether persons who'd been shot also went overboard. Over 175 bullets pierced the pilot house alone, and the captain of the Verona, Chance Wiman, was only able to avoid being shot by ducking behind the ship's safe.

Once the ship righted herself somewhat after the near-capsize, some slack came on the bowline, and Engineer Shellgren put the engines hard astern, parting the line, and enabling the steamer to escape. Out in the harbor, Captain Wiman warned off the approaching Calista and then raced back to Seattle.

Death toll

At the end of the mayhem, two citizen deputies lay dead with 16 or 20 others wounded, including Sheriff McRae. The two businessman-deputies that were shot were actually shot in the back by fellow deputies; their injuries were not caused by Wobbly gunfire. The IWW officially listed 5 dead with 27 wounded, although it is speculated that as many as 12 IWW members may have been killed. There was a good likelihood that at least some of the casualties on the dock were caused not by IWW firing from the steamer, but on vigilante rounds from the cross-fire of bullets coming from the Edison. The local Everett Wobblies started their street rally anyway, and as a result, McRae's deputized citizens rounded them up and hauled them off to jail. As a result of the shootings, Governor Ernest Lister of the State of Washington sent companies of militia to Everett and Seattle to help maintain order.

Question of violence
There have been many efforts to find the IWW, a self-described radical union, at fault for the violence. Other historians have placed blame on external forces, including that a private detective working as a labor spy had advocated violent action at an IWW meeting in Everett.

Aftermath
Upon returning to Seattle, 74 Wobblies were arrested as a direct result of the "Everett Massacre" including IWW leader Thomas H. Tracy. They were taken to the Snohomish County jail in Everett and charged with murder of the two deputies. After a two-month trial, Tracy was acquitted by a jury on May 5, 1917. Shortly thereafter, all charges were dropped against the remaining 73 defendants and they were released from jail.

See also

List of massacres in Washington
Industrial Workers of the World
List of incidents of civil unrest in the United States
List of worker deaths in United States labor disputes

Footnotes

Further reading
 Charles Ashleigh, "Defense Fires Opening Guns: Everett Brutality Revealed in Court," International Socialist Review, vol. 17, no. 11 (May 1917), pp. 673–674.
 Walker C. Smith, "The Everett Massacre: A History of the Class Struggle in the Lumber Industry," I.W.W. Publishing Bureau 1916.

Archives
 Everett Prisoners' Defense Committee Records. 1916. 4 items. At the Labor Archives of Washington, University of Washington Libraries Special Collections.
 Industrial Workers of the World, Seattle Joint Branches Records. 1905-1950. . At the Labor Archives of Washington, University of Washington Libraries Special Collections.
 Industrial Workers of the World photograph collection. circa 1910s-circa 1940s. 121 photographic prints (2 boxes); sizes vary. At the Labor Archives of Washington, University of Washington Libraries Special Collections.
 John Leonard Miller Papers. 1923-1986.  plus 2 sound cassettes. At the Labor Archives of Washington, University of Washington Libraries Special Collections.
 John Leonard Miller Photograph Collection. circa 1920-1975. 17 photographic prints (1 box); various sizes. At the Labor Archives of Washington, University of Washington Libraries Special Collections.
 Anna Louise Strong Papers. 1885-1971. 24.11 cubic feet (43 boxes, 3 packages, 3 folders). Contains material collected by Strong about the IWW Trial and Everett Massacre from 1916-1917. At the Labor Archives of Washington, University of Washington Libraries Special Collections.
 The National Archives Contains results of an inquiry into the Everett Massacre collected by the Bureau of Marine Inspection and Navigation.
 Collection of Identification Photographs of Industrial Workers of the World Strikers, Yale Collection of Western Americana, Beinecke Rare Book and Manuscript Library, Yale University.

External links
 The Everett Massacre Digital Collection Everett Public Library.
 Everett Massacre of 1916 University of St. Francis.
 Everett Massacre Collection University of Washington Libraries Digital Collections.
 Essay on the Everett Massacre HistoryLink.org - The Online Encyclopedia of Washington State History.

1916 murders in the United States
1916 in Washington (state)
Mass murder in 1916
Massacres in 1916
November 1916 events
Everett, Washington
History of Snohomish County, Washington
Labor disputes in Washington (state)
Industrial Workers of the World in Washington (state)
Protest-related deaths
Labor-related violence in the United States
Vigilantism in the United States
Crimes in Washington (state)
Police brutality in the United States